The 2018 Armenian Revolution, most commonly known in Armenia as #MerzhirSerzhin (meaning "#RejectSerzh"), was a series of anti-government protests in Armenia from April to May 2018 staged by various political and civil groups led by a member of the Armenian parliament  — Nikol Pashinyan (head of the Civil Contract party). Protests and marches took place initially in response to Serzh Sargsyan's third consecutive term as the most powerful figure in the government of Armenia and later against the Republican Party-controlled government in general. Pashinyan declared it a Velvet Revolution.

On April 22, Pashinyan was arrested and held in solitary confinement overnight, then released on April 23, the same day that Sargsyan resigned, saying "I was wrong, while Nikol Pashinyan was right". The event is referred to by some as a peaceful revolution akin to revolutions in other post-Soviet states. By the evening of April 25, the Republican Party’s coalition partner ARF-Dashnaktsutyun had withdrawn from the coalition.

By April 28, all of the opposition parties in Armenia's parliament had announced they would support Pashinyan's candidacy. A vote was scheduled in the National Assembly for May 1; for Pashinyan to be elected Prime Minister, which required 53 votes, he would have had to win the votes of at least six members of the Republican Party. Pashinyan was the only candidate who was put forward for the vote. However, the Republican Party unanimously voted against Pashinyan – 102 MPs were present, out of which 56 voted against his candidacy and 45 voted for it. One week later, on May 8, the second vote took place. Pashinyan was elected Prime Minister with 59 votes.

Preceding situation
In 2012–2017 reported levels of trust in national government (25%) and confidence in judicial system (29%) in Armenia were below of all its neighbouring countries.

Nomination of Sargsyan for the post of Prime Minister
Demonstrations and protests began in March 2018, when members of the Republican Party did not exclude the option of nominating Serzh Sargsyan for the prime minister's post. This meant a continuation of Sargsyan's rule (as either Prime Minister or President) since March 2007. He had amended the constitution in 2015 to remove term limits which would have prevented him doing this.

Protesters had vowed to block the party's headquarters on April 14, where leaders were going to gather to formally nominate Serzh Sargsyan for prime minister. The Republican Party held its meeting outside of capital Yerevan and unanimously voted to formally nominate Serzh Sargsyan for the office of prime minister.  The coalition partner Armenian Revolutionary Federation-Dashnaksutyun (ARF-D) supported the ruling Republican Party’s decision, as did most of the opposition Prosperous Armenia Party caucus.

Protests

On March 31, Nikol Pashinyan began his Im Qayl (my step) protest walk, starting in the city of Gyumri, and walking through cities and towns such as Vanadzor, Dilijan, Hrazdan, and Abovyan, before finally reaching Yerevan on April 13 and holding a small rally.

About 100 protesters stayed overnight on France Square after the first day of protests, and an equal number did the same on Saturday night, some sleeping in tents, others gathered around fires. As of Sunday morning, the Armenian police had made no effort to disrupt the demonstrations.

On Monday April 16, the "Take a Step, Reject Serzh" campaign began actions of civil disobedience. On April 17, the day that the prime minister's election was scheduled, the protesters intended to block entrances to the building of the National Assembly in order to prevent the vote from taking place. Lines of riot police stopped them from advancing further towards the National Assembly building.

After the election of the former president Serzh Sargsyan as the new prime minister, the protests continued to grow, despite hundreds of people being detained by police. The prime minister in response asked the government to take back the presidential mansion which it had given him a few weeks earlier. The crowds reached 50,000 on the night of April 21, with countless sporadic street closures in the capital, which also began to spread across the country.

As the crowds grew, the new prime minister called repeatedly for talks with the leader of the protest movement, Nikol Pashinyan, but Pashinyan said he was only willing to discuss the terms of the Prime Minister's resignation. After Pashinyan's rally was visited by the Armenian President on the evening of April 21 for a brief chat with Pashinyan, Pashinyan agreed to meet the prime minister at 10 am on April 22, saying he believed the topic would be Serzh Sargsyan's resignation.

April 22
The meeting, which lasted for a mere three minutes, failed to achieve anything, with Sargsyan walking out of it and accusing the opposition of "blackmail" when Pashinyan stated he had only agreed to discuss terms of the Prime Minister's resignation and nothing else. During the meeting, Sargsyan asked Pashinyan not to speak on behalf of the people and not to issue ultimatums to the government, given the low level of support for his political alliance (less than 10 percent of the vote in the past parliamentary elections). He also warned that Pashinyan had not "learned the lessons of March 1", a reference to the protestors killed by police while contesting the validity of the election results of Sargsyan's election 10 years earlier, amounting to an open threat of violence against the protesters gathering daily in around the nation.

Immediately after the meeting, Pashinyan led a group of supporters from the site of the meeting by Republic Square on a long march down Tigran Mets and Artsakh streets to the Erebuni district, where they were met by riot police and stun grenades as Pashinyan was detained followed by mass detentions of protestors, including opposition lawmakers Sasun Mikayelyan and Ararat Mirzoyan.  Protests continue throughout the city. By the evening 232 protestors had been detained or arrested, and, according to Radio Free Europe/Radio Liberty, tens of thousands gathered in Republic Square to continue to demand the resignation of PM Serzh Sargsyan. The police issued a statement saying that Pashinyan, Mikaelyan and Mirzoyan had been detained for 72 hours; however criminal charges could only be brought against them if the Republican-controlled National Assembly stripped them of their parliamentary immunity.

April 23

Protests resumed on April 23, with media outlets reporting that former and current members of the Armenian armed forces, including participants of the 2016 April War, have joined in the rallies for the first time. This information was later confirmed by the Ministry of Defence.

Pashinyan was released at 3pm, and went directly to Republic Square where he spoke briefly, saying he would return at 6:30pm.  By 4:30pm, Prime Minister Serzh Sargsyan had posted a message on the official website of the prime minister announcing his resignation.  Former Prime Minister Karen Karapetyan succeeded Sargsyan as acting Prime Minister.

April 24

April 24 is marked as the national day of remembrance of the Armenian genocide. The protesters gathered in masses and walked to Tsitsernakaberd, Armenia's national Genocide Memorial. No protest was held on that day.

April 25

Pashinyan called for renewed protests on 25 April after talks with the Republican Party were cancelled due to Karapetyan’s refusal to accept preconditions laid down by Pashinyan. Earlier Pashinyan stated that the Republican Party had no right to hold power in Armenia, and that a "people's candidate" should be appointed prime minister prior to holding snap elections. He added that the protest movement should nominate this transitional prime minister, a position that was rejected by the current government as it would violate the law. Protesters took to the streets to block the road to Yerevan’s international airport and the road leading to the border with Georgia. Meanwhile, the Prosperous Armenia Party and the Armenian Revolutionary Federation both declared their support for Pashinyan's movement, with the latter pulling out of the ruling coalition. Pashinyan vowed to continue the protests until he was appointed prime minister.

April 26

Tens of thousands continued to protest on 26 April, though Pashinyan asked protestors to stop blocking streets. The ruling HHK party announced it was ready to meet with Pashinyan without any preconditions, while Pashinyan offered to negotiate with them while insisting he must become Prime Minister.

April 27

Pashinyan called on his supporters to suspend their rallies in Yerevan for 2 days while he held rallies in Gyumri on 27 April and Vanadzor on 28 April. In the morning he met with Armenia's largely ceremonial President, leaders of the governing party's former coalition partner the ARF, as well as Parliament's second largest faction BHK. In an interview on the same day, the president hailed the "New Armenia" that has come about due to the protests, and the chance for "a real democratic state". Meanwhile the ruling HHK party announced that they do not see any regime change occurring in Armenia.

April 28

On 28 April, Pashinyan held rallies in Vanadzor and Ijevan, while the second and third largest parties in Parliament – BHK and ARF – announced they would support his candidacy for PM, and the ruling HHK party announced they would not block Pashinyan's candidacy, and that they would not put forward their own candidate.

May 1
Parliament held elections for a new Prime Minister, with the opposition leader Pashinyan the only nominee, as over 100,000 people watched the 9 hour session being broadcast live at Republic Square.  However the majority party blocked his nomination by voting against him with one exception. After the election, prominent Armenian singers such as Iveta Mukuchyan and Sona Shahgeldyan performed for the crowd and made inspiring speeches. Pashinyan walked to Republic Square and told the crowd to go on strike the next day, and block all transportation from 8:15 in the morning until 5 in the evening, then gather for another rally at 7pm in Republic Square.

May 2
The nation ground to a halt as countless streets and highways were peacefully blocked throughout the nation, and many workers and businesses went on strike.  The main airport access road was cut off, with some workers striking, and even land crossings were blocked.  150,000 people gathered in another evening rally in Republic Square to listen to Pashinyan speak, and were told that he had been informed that due to the strike, the ruling party had decided to support his candidacy in the next round of voting on May 8.  Protests were suspended in the meantime.

May 8
On May 8 Parliament again had a vote on a new Prime Minister, and again Nikol Pashinyan was the only candidate.  This time the majority Republican party gave Pashinyan enough votes to win with a 59–42 margin.  All the votes against Pashinyan still came from the Republican party.

Reactions 
On April 4 Edmon Marukyan, leader of the Bright Armenia party, which cooperates with the Civil Contract party lead by Nikol Pashinyan in the Way Out Alliance published an article in Aravot newspaper, in which he stated his preference for formal means of counteracting the ruling coalition rather than civil disobedience actions.

Leader of the Free Democrats party and former MP Khachatur Kokobelyan attended protests and expressed his support for the actions.

Many cultural figures had already declared solidarity with the opposition movement. In particular, well-known musician Serj Tankian of System of a Down addressed the activists declaring his solidarity and support, stressing the impermissibility of one-party rule in Armenia. Some organizations of the diaspora, in particular the Congress of Armenians of Europe, also expressed support for the opposition.

International reactions
: On April 24 the head of the EU Delegation to Armenia hailed the success in the civic disobedience campaign in the country, promising a more intensive process towards the ratification of Comprehensive and Enhanced Partnership Agreement.
: Mikheil Saakashvili, former president of Georgia, released a video on April 23 congratulating the Armenian people on Sargsyan's resignation. He stated: "Today you have every right to be proud of yourself, to be proud of the fact that you are Armenians, the proud people who could prove to the whole world that they have dignity, that they want to live in normal human conditions, free from corruption. Armenia has a great future; today I was convinced of it again. I support you, we will always be with you. Well done!" He also claimed that the movement is a "rebellion against Russia".
: Foreign Ministry spokeswoman Maria Zakharova praised the peaceful transition, adding that "Armenia, Russia is always with you!" A statement on the Foreign Ministry official web page reads: "We hope that the situation will develop exclusively in the legal and constitutional field, and all political forces will show responsibility and readiness for a constructive dialogue. We are convinced that the prompt return of life in the country to normal and the restoration of public accord meet the fundamental interests of the fraternal Armenia."
: On April 23 US Ambassador Richard Mills praised the Armenian police and anti-government protesters led by Nikol Pashinyan for avoiding bloodshed during their standoff that led to the resignation of Prime Minister Serzh Sargsyan. A statement by the US State Department expressed hope that his successor will be chosen in a transparent and constitutional manner. The statement also called on Armenia’s leading political groups to “avoid an escalation of the situation and any violent actions.”  Protests were held by Armenians in various communities of the United States, with 5,000 protesters gathering in solidarity with those protesting in Armenia on April 22 and additional protests being held on other days, including May 8.

Impact

During the 2020 Belarusian protests, the Armenian revolution was brought up as a model for Belarus for its lack of anti-Russian or pro-Western geopolitical orientation by commentators such as Carl Bildt, Anders Åslund, Ian Bremmer, Yaroslav Trofimov, Ben Judah, and others. Belarusian journalist Franak Viačorka criticized this notion. Armenia's Foreign Minister Zohrab Mnatsakanyan also rejected the comparisons. "Armenia followed its own path and it’s not quite correct to draw parallels based on that. True, there might be some common parameters, but on the whole these are different situations," he said.

Armenian Velvet Revolution in Art 
The Armenian velvet revolution almost immediately found its response in modern Armenian art. One of the first artists who touched on the topic was the artist Anna Soghomonyan with her painting "The Armenian Velvet Revolution". This is a multi-figure composition in a fabulous style inherent in the author, which includes people of different types who participated in the events of spring 2018. According to the author, this painting is very symbolic not only because it was created during a very emotional period and represents a concentrated reflection of these emotions, but also because it was sold on the day of the defeat of the Armenians in the Second Artsakh War, which, in fact, may symbolize the failure of the hopes of the national awakening of 2018.

In July 2018, in the exhibition hall "Albert and Tove Boyajyan" of the State Academy of Fine Arts of Armenia, art historian Meri Ghazaryan organized a photo exhibition entitled "Velvet Revolution: Between Picture and Reality", which presented the works of young photographers who caught the fresh breath of the revolution, known and unknown pages of spring events, impressive episodes and faces.

In October 2018, art critic Vardan Jaloyan and a group of artists organized an exhibition of contemporary art "Revolutionary Sensorium" at the History Museum of Armenia, where the key events of the revolution were presented to museum visitors in a combination of photographs and video installations.

On May 9, 2019, within the framework of the 59th Venice Biennale of Art, the Armenian pavilion was opened, where the project "Revolutionary Sensorium" was presented under the curatorship of art critic Susanna Gulamiryan. The participants of the project were a group of artists "Artlab Yerevan" (Hovhannes Margaryan, Vardan Jaloyan, Artur Petrosyan, Gagik Charchyan) and artist Narine Arakelyan.

In November 2018, the literary website "Groghutsav", founded by writers Arpi Voskanyan and Hambartsum Hambartsumyan, was relaunched. Since 2011, Groghutsav has rallied writers involved in the opposition, political struggle and not disdaining to bring political and social problems to literature on one platform, but in July 2017, due to lack of financial resources, it ceased its activities. The restarted project has a number of subprojects, one of which is called the "Revolutionary Program". This program is carried out by publishing works that focus on the velvet revolution in Armenia in 2018 with its results and consequences.

See also

 2008 Armenian presidential election protests, especially clashes that occurred 1 March
 2011 Armenian protests, triggered over Karen Karapetyan's decision to ban street vendors in Yerevan
 Mashtots Park Movement, 2012 protests to save green space in Yerevan
 2013 Armenian protests, over Serzh Sargsyan's re-election
 2013 Armenian protests over public transportation fare hikes
 Electric Yerevan, 2015 protests over electricity rate hikes
 2016 Yerevan hostage crisis demonstrations
 Colour revolution
 List of protests in the 21st century
 I Am Not Alone, a 2019 documentary film about the revolution

Further reading

 Lanskoy, Miriam & Suthers, Elspeth. "Armenia's Velvet Revolution." Journal of Democracy, vol. 30 no. 2, 2019, pp. 85–99.

References

Protests
Armenian
21st-century revolutions
Armenian protests
Armenian protests
Armenian democracy movements
Colour revolutions
Protests in Armenia
Nikol Pashinyan